The Gilbert Baronetcy was a title in the Baronetage of the United Kingdom. It was created in 1851 for Major-General Sir Walter Gilbert. The title became extinct on the death of his son Francis, the second Baronet.

Gilbert baronets (1851)
Sir Walter Raleigh Gilbert, 1st Baronet (1785–1853)
Sir Francis Gilbert, 2nd Baronet (1816-1863)

Arms

References

Extinct baronetcies in the Baronetage of the United Kingdom